The S20 is a railway service of the Zürich S-Bahn that provides rush-hour service between  and , in the Swiss canton of Zürich. Swiss Federal Railways operates the service.

History 

Operations 
 

The service does not operate on weekends. Most services are operated by SBB-CFF-FFS Re 420 locomotives pulling coaches.

References

External links 
 2022 timetable

Zürich S-Bahn lines
Transport in the canton of Zürich